Darko Karadžić (Cyrillic: Дарко Караџић; born 17 April 1989) is a retired Montenegrin footballer.

Club career
He played in the youth teams of FK Sutjeska Nikšić and Red Star Belgrade. He made his senior debut in 2008 when he signed with Serbian side FK Rad. Afterwards, he played on loan for Hungarian Championship club FC Fehérvár and Serbian First League club FK Inđija. In 2010, he returned to Montenegro this time to play with FK Rudar Pljevlja but stayed only for a short period as he moved to FK Čelik Nikšić. The following winter he signed with FK Spartak Subotica from the Serbian SuperLiga. However, in summer 2011 he returned to the club where he started playing, FK Sutjeska Nikšić. In June 2014 he signed with FK Mladost Podgorica. After a short spell with FK Mornar, he rejoined FK Sutjeska Nikšić.

International career
He was part of the Serbia and Montenegro squad at the 2006 UEFA European Under-17 Championship, where he scored against Belgium.

Honours
Rudar Pljevlja
Montenegrin First League: 2009–10
Sutjeska
Montenegrin First League: 2012–13, 2013–14

References

External links
 Profile and stats at Srbijafudbal
 Darko Karadžić Stats at Utakmica.rs

1989 births
Living people
Footballers from Nikšić
Association football midfielders
Montenegrin footballers
FK Rad players
Fehérvár FC players
FK Inđija players
FK Rudar Pljevlja players
FK Čelik Nikšić players
FK Spartak Subotica players
FK Sutjeska Nikšić players
OFK Titograd players
FK Mornar players
Nemzeti Bajnokság I players
Montenegrin First League players
Serbian SuperLiga players
Montenegrin expatriate footballers
Expatriate footballers in Hungary
Montenegrin expatriate sportspeople in Hungary
Expatriate footballers in Serbia
Montenegrin expatriate sportspeople in Serbia